Sassafrass! is the sixth studio album by Canadian-New Zealand country singer Tami Neilson, released in June 2018.

Production

The album was inspired by Neilson's experiences of becoming a mother, losing her father and turning 40. She felt that the album expressed her "coming into confidence as a woman" and is a celebration of her newly-found freedom. Because of this, many of the songs on the album focused on gender equality. Sonically, Neilson was inspired by musicians including Sister Rosetta Tharpe, Big Mama Thornton and Mavis Staples. The song "Miss Jones" was written as a tribute to Sharon Jones.

The album's title, Sassafrass!, is a slang term referring to a self-assured person.

Release and promotion

Three singles were released from the album: "Stay Outta My Business" in March 2018, "Manitoba Sunrise at Motel 6" in May and  "Devil in a Dress" in July, a month after the album's release.

Reception

At the 2018 New Zealand Music Awards, Sassafrass! was nominated for the Album of the Year award, and led to Neilson being nominated for the Best Solo Artist award.

Track listing

Credits and personnel

Brett Adams – guitar
Chris Chetland – mastering
Ashley Church – photography
Anita Clark – strings
Georgie Clifford – backing vocals
Sarena Close – backing vocals
Reuben Derrick – horns
Ben Edwards  – co-producer, mixing engineer
Natalee Fisher – hair, make-up
Mike Hall – bass
Xoë Hall – artwork
Nyree Huyser – backing vocals
Dave Khan – strings
Jules Koblun – artwork design
Joe McCallum – drums, percussion
Tami Neilson – acoustic guitar, co-producer, vocals
Cameron Pearce – horns
Josh Petrie – assistant engineer
Gwyn Reynolds – horns
Scott Taitoko – horns
Neil Watson – guitar, pedal steel guitar

Charts

Weekly charts

Year-end charts

Release history

References

2018 albums
Tami Neilson albums